Albarran may refer to:
 Albarrán, Spanish-language surname
 Pierre Albarran (18931960), French Olympic tennis player, and auction and contract bridge player and theorist